Izvoraş-67  was a Moldovan football club based in Ratuș, Moldova. They have played in the Moldovan "A" Division, the second division in Moldovan football in season 2008–09 and won Division B North.

Achievements

Divizia B
 Winners (1): 2005–06

External links
on Soccerway.com
Izvoraș-67  at weltfussballarchiv.com
Izvoraș-67 at footballfacts.ru
Official website

Football clubs in Moldova
Defunct football clubs in Moldova
Association football clubs established in 1967
Association football clubs disestablished in 2009
1967 establishments in the Moldavian Soviet Socialist Republic
2009 disestablishments in Moldova